Laura Alicia Garza Galindo (born 27 November 1947) is a Mexican politician affiliated with the Institutional Revolutionary Party. As of 2014 she served as Senator of the LIV, LVIII and LIX Legislatures of the Mexican Congress representing Tamaulipas and as Deputy of the LV and LVII Legislatures.

References

1947 births
Living people
People from Ciudad Victoria
Women members of the Senate of the Republic (Mexico)
Members of the Senate of the Republic (Mexico)
Members of the Chamber of Deputies (Mexico)
Presidents of the Chamber of Deputies (Mexico)
Institutional Revolutionary Party politicians
Autonomous University of San Luis Potosi alumni
National Autonomous University of Mexico alumni
Academic staff of the Autonomous University of Tamaulipas
Academic staff of the University of Guadalajara
20th-century Mexican politicians
20th-century Mexican women politicians
21st-century Mexican politicians
21st-century Mexican women politicians
Women members of the Chamber of Deputies (Mexico)
Women legislative speakers